The 2008 Holland Series involved the defending champions Corendon Kinheim being defeated by the Amsterdam Pirates in three straight games. The first two games were postponed due to heavy rainfall. It was the first championship for the Pirates since 1990, their second since the start of the Holland series, and their third title overall.

Games

4 October 2008 – Kinheim at Amsterdam 3–4

7 October 2008 – Amsterdam at Haarlem 6–3

8 October 2008 – Amsterdam at Haarlem 12–0

References

2008 in Dutch sport
2008 in baseball
October 2008 sports events in Europe